James Alex Baggett (born February 2, 1932) is an American historian, author, and former university dean. He worked at Union University and wrote a book about it.

In 2003 his talk on his book about "Scalawags" was aired on C-Span. He discussed the book at the Jimmy Carter Presidential Library. He has written several entries for the Texas State Historical Association's Handbook.

He is married to Lillian Faulkner Baggett, a fellow educator and author.

William Harris Bragg described his book on "Scalawags" as "detailed, balanced, and convincing." Michael Perman called it groundbreaking. Union University holds an annual history research paper competition in his honor.

Work
The rise and fall of the Texas radicals, 1867-1883
Bemis: Continuity and Change in a West Tennessee Cotton Mill Town (1992)
Memories of Madison County (1993)
So Great a Cloud of Witnesses: Union University, 1823-2000
Homegrown Yankees: Tennessee's Union Cavalry in the Civil War
The Scalawags: Southern Dissenters in the Civil War and Reconstruction LSU Press (2004)

Articles
"The Constitutional Union Party in Texas” Southwestern Historical Quarterly 82 (January 1979)

References

External links

Living people
1932 births
21st-century American historians
20th-century American historians
Union University
Historians of the American Civil War